Venezia is a ghost town situated in Yavapai County, Arizona, United States.

References

External links
 
 
 Venezia – ghosttowns.com
 Venezia – Ghost Town of the Month at azghosttowns.com

Populated places in Yavapai County, Arizona
Ghost towns in Arizona